Ismir may mean:
The International Society for Music Information Retrieval or International Symposium on Music Information Retrieval (ISMIR)
The Turkish city of İzmir
A first name